The Almus Dam (Almus Barajı in Turkish) is an earthen embankment dam that is near the town of Almus (28 kilometers East of Tokat city in center north of Turkey) and is located on the River Yesilirmak which runs into the Black Sea. The main purposes of the dam is irrigation, flood control and hydroelectricity. The hydroelectric power plant (established in 1966) at the dam has a capacity of 27 megawatts (three facilities at 9 megawatts each). The dam contains  of material and irrigates an area of 21,350 hectares.

External links

A
Hydroelectric power stations in Turkey
Dams completed in 1966